Liverpool Mossley Hill was a parliamentary constituency centred on the Mossley Hill suburb of Liverpool. It returned one Member of Parliament (MP) to the House of Commons of the Parliament of the United Kingdom, elected by the first-past-the-post voting system.

History
The City of Liverpool wards of Aigburth, Church, Grassendale, Picton, and Smithdown.

The constituency was created for the 1983 general election; half of its territory was previously in the abolished constituency of Liverpool Edge Hill.

The constituency returned the same MP throughout its existence: David Alton, who initially represented the Liberals, then from 1988 was a Liberal Democrat, after the Liberals' merger with the Social Democratic Party. Alton had first been elected to parliament at a by-election in March 1979 for Liverpool Edge Hill, and held that seat until its abolition in 1983.

The constituency was abolished for the 1997 general election; Alton retired from the Commons and was appointed a cross-bench member of the House of Lords, and the Mossley Hill area itself was transferred to the redrawn constituency of Liverpool Riverside, a safe Labour seat.

Members of Parliament

Elections

Elections in the 1980s

Elections in the 1990s

Notes and references

Mossley Hill
Parliamentary constituencies in North West England (historic)